Jean Morin (May 28, 1901 – December 25, 1975) was a French bobsledder who competed in the late 1940s. He finished ninth in the four-man event at the 1948 Winter Olympics in St. Moritz.

References

1948 bobsleigh four-man results
Jean Morin's profile at Sports Reference.com

French male bobsledders
Olympic bobsledders of France
Bobsledders at the 1948 Winter Olympics
1901 births
1975 deaths